Khalchayan (also Khaltchaïan) is an archaeological site, thought to be a small palace or a reception hall, located near the modern town of Denov in Surxondaryo Region of southern Uzbekistan. It is located in the valley of the Surkhan Darya, a northern tributary of the Oxus (modern Amu Darya).

Terracotta statues
The site is usually attributed to the early Kushans, or their ancestors the Yuezhi/Tocharians. It was excavated by Galina Pugachenkova between 1959 and 1963. The interior walls are decorated with clay sculptures and paintings dated to the mid-1st century BCE, but they are thought to represent events as early as the 2nd century BCE. Various panels depict scenes of Kushan life: battles, feasts, portraits of rulers.

Some of the Khalchayan sculptural scenes are thought to depict the Kushans fighting against a Saka tribe. The Yuezhis are shown with a majestic demeanour, whereas the Sakas are typically represented with side-wiskers in more or less grotesque attitudes.

Portrait of a Parthian king
The bust of a Parthian king was discovered among the sculptures at Khalchayan, and the time period and resemblance from numismatics suggest that this may represent Vardanes I as he sought refuge, and possibly an alliance, in Bactria at the Yuezhi court. Tacitus related that Vardanes "took refuge among the Bactrians", after his failure at the siege of Seleucia circa 35 CE. These events might give a terminus post quem of around 45-47 CE for the Khalchayan portrait of the Parthian king, a period when the contemporary Kushan ruler may have been Kujula Kadphises.

Influences

According to Benjamin Rowland, the art of Kalchayan of the end of the 2nd century BCE is ultimately derived from Hellenistic art, and possibly from the art of the cities of Ai-Khanoum and Nysa, but it also has similarities with the later Art of Gandhara and may even have been at the origin of its development. 

Rowland particularly draws attention to the similarity of the ethnic types represented at Khalchayan and in the art of Gandhara, and also in the style of portraiture itself. For example, Rowland find a great proximity between the famous head of a Yuezhi prince from Khalchayan, and the head of Gandharan Bodhisattvas, giving the example of the Gandharan head of a Bodhisattva in the Philadelphia Museum of Art. The similarity of the Gandhara Bodhisattva with the portrait of the Kushan ruler Heraios is also striking. According to Rowland the Bactrian art of Khalchayan thus survived for several centuries through its influence in the art of Gandhara, thanks to the patronage of the Kushans.

References

Sources
"Les Saces", Iaroslav Lebedynsky

Further reading
G. A. Pugachenkova. . "The Sculpture of Khalchayan". Moscow, 1970.
G. A. Pugachenkova. "Khalchayan". Tashkent, 1966.

External links
 "A Comparison of Images of Kushans from Coins and Sculpture", with images from Pugachenkova (1970) The Sculpture of Khalchayan.{dead link}
 "Khalchayan", Encyclopædia Iranica.

Archaeological sites in Uzbekistan
Kushan Empire
Surxondaryo Region